Tanner may refer to:

 Tanner (occupation), the tanning of leather and hides

People
 Tanner (given name), 
 Tanner (surname), a surname (including a list of people with the name)
The Tanner Sisters, also referred to as "The Harbingers of Weirdness"
 Simon the Tanner (New Testament), a Jaffa resident where Saint Peter stayed, as told in the New Testament
 Simon the Tanner (10th century), a Coptic Orthodox saint 
 Theodotus the Tanner (fl. late 2nd century), an early Christian writer from Byzantium

Places

Populated places
In the United States
 Tanner, Alabama, an unincorporated community
 Tanner, Georgia, an unincorporated community
 Tanner, Indiana, an unincorporated community
 Tanner, Kentucky, an unincorporated community
 Tanner, Missouri, an unincorporated community
 Tanner, Washington, a census-designated place
 Tanner, West Virginia, an unincorporated community
 Tanner Township, Kidder County, North Dakota, a civil township

Elsewhere
 Tanner's Settlement, Lunenburg County, Nova Scotia, Canada

Other places
 Tanner Block, a historic building in Oswego, New York, United States
 Tanner Farmhouse, a historic residence near Wilmer, Alabama, United States
 Tanner High School, a school in Limestone County, Alabama, United States
 Tanner Hill Estate, a public housing estate in Tanner Hill Road, North Point, Hong Kong
 Tanner–Hiller Airport, a public airport in Barre, Massachusetts, United States  
 Tanner Island, the westernmost and largest of the Pickersgill Islands, off the south coast of South Georgia
 Tanner Moor, a moorland in Austria
 Tanner Trail, a hiking trail located on the South Rim of the Grand Canyon National Park in Arizona, United States

Popular culture
 Tanner (film), a 1985 Swiss film
 Tanner '88, a television series about a fictional US presidential nominee
 Tanner, fictional video game character and protagonist of the Driver series 
 Tanner on Tanner, a 2004 comedy 
 "Mr. Tanner", a song by Harry Chapin from his 1974 album Short Stories
 Tanner (band), an American band active in the 1990s

Other uses
 Tanner, the sixpence, a British pre-decimal coin
 13668 Tanner, a main-belt asteroid discovered on 28 April 1997
 Tanner crab (Chionoecetes bairdi), a crab species
 Tanner Cup, a New Zealand sailing competition
 Tanner graph, a bipartite graph used to state constraints or equations which specify error correcting codes
 Tanner scale, a scale of physical development in children, adolescents and adults
 USNS Tanner, a ship
 USS Tanner (AGS-15), an attack cargo ship of the U.S. Navy
 Prionus coriarius, the tanner beetle

See also
 O.C. Tanner (disambiguation)
 Taner
 Tanners (disambiguation)
 Tanna (disambiguation)